The UPLB Museum of Natural History (also known as MNH) is a natural science and natural history museum within the University of the Philippines Los Baños (UPLB) campus. It serves as a center for documentation, research, and information of flora and fauna of the Philippines. The museum is one of the research and extension units of the UPLB and its role parallels that of a library for written records.

History 
The museum was established through the approval of the University of the Philippines Board of Regents during its 877th meeting in 1976. According to the announcement published at the time, it was to be "organized out of the staff and physical resources of the existing museum and herbaria at UPLB, including the hortorium and culture collections of separate departments in the Colleges of Agriculture, Forestry, and Sciences and Humanities."

Its founding director was the late Professor Juan V. Pancho, a plant taxonomist of national and international acclaim and an indefatigable mentor to a select group of Filipino and foreign plant taxonomists.

During World War II, the then UP College of Agriculture and the insect collections of Dr. Charles Fuller Baker (the second Dean of the College), Dr. Leopoldo Uichanco (The Father of Entomology in the Philippines and Pioneer of Insect Ecology) and many other entomologists were burned and destroyed.

Early deans' study of Mount Makiling 

The two American deans, Copeland and Baker, studied the vegetation of Mount Makiling, which is the best scientifically studied mountain of the country, with materials dating back to the time of the Malaspina Expedition in 1789.

Sections 
The museum has more than 600,000 specimens distributed to the following sections: Botanical Herbarium, Entomological Museum, Forestry Herbarium and Wood Collection, Mycological Herbarium, Hortorium, Microbial and Algal Culture Collections, Zoological and Wildlife Museum, and the Integrated Biodiversity Exhibit.

Botanical Herbarium 
The Botanical Herbarium (Herbarium Code: CAHUP, College of Agriculture Herbarium UP) houses approximately 70,000 specimens representing about 12,000 plant species. The collection is composed of bryophyte, pteridophyte, and spermatophyte specimens collected from across the Philippines, many of which are from Mt. Makiling in Luzon Island.

Entomological Museum 
The Entomological Museum is the largest entomological (insect) collection in the Philippines with close to half a million specimens of insects, acari and aranea.

The collection is composed of pinned, slide-mounted, and alcohol-preserved insects and arthropod specimens and continuously grows with the help of collection expeditions, biodiversity studies, and student submissions.

Forest Herbarium and Wood Collection 
The Forestry Herbarium and Wood Collection, formally recognized as the LBC or Los Banos Collection in the Index Herbariorum has around 15,000 specimens of forest plants, including palms, and a modest wood collection. From 2001-2010, the LBC received 5 holotypes of new taxa of Philippine seed plants.

Mycological Herbarium 
The Mycological Herbarium, with a fungal collection of around 13,000 specimens, traces its roots to the Dr. Gerardo O. Ocfemia (considered as the Father of Philippine Plant Pathology) Memorial Herbarium which was established in the 1960s from extensive fungal collections in the Philippines by iconoclast mycologist Dr. Don R. Reynolds and his students. The herbarium was formally recognized in 1966 and became included in the Index Herbariorum in 1968 as CALP (College of Agriculture, Laguna, Philippines).

Similar to the Entomological Museum, the collections of the Mycological Herbarium could have been bigger if not for the complete destruction of the Baker Fungus Collection during the Japanese and American invasions of World War II.

Hortorium 
The Hortorium is an in-situ collection of around 400 living plants, mostly of food, medicinal, tonic and ornamental value, and maintained and cared for in a small portion of land adjacent the Molawin River that traverses the UPLB campus. The Hortorium also serves as a laboratory area for some university courses focused on ecology, hydrology, and environmental science. Despite being a disturbed freshwater ecosystem, the Hortorium still harbors new and unique organisms such a minute cockroach, several species of predatory mites, and a "pirate" ant.

In 2015, the first ex-situ conservation project for native Philippine amphibians, Project Palaka, was established within the Hortorium and focused on amphibians from within Mt. Makiling forest preserve.

Microbial and Algal Culture Collections 

The Microbial Culture Collection (MCC) of the museum is composed of more than 4,000 strains of bacteria, yeasts, mold species and other cultures. In 1984, it became the first Philippine microbial collection included (WDCM #39) in the World Federation for Culture Collections (WFCC). The most notable research contribution of the MCC in the biodiversity of Mt. Makiling is the discovery of Caldivirga maquilingensis in 1999 and Caldisphaera lagunensis in 2003 from Mudsprings (an acidic hot spring) in Mt. Makiling. The culture collection is currently an affiliate of the Philippine National Collection of Microorganisms and an active member of the Philippine Network of Microbial Culture Collections.

The Algal Culture Collection holds 86 strains.

Zoological and Wildlife Museum 

The Zoological and Wildlife Museum consists of around 20,000 specimens of mollusks, fish, amphibians, reptiles, mammals and other wildlife, half of which is represented by the monumental collections of Dioscoro S. Rabor, the Father of Philippine Wildlife conservation. Dr. Rabor led more than 50 biodiversity field expeditions in his 20 years of research, collecting more than 60,000 specimens which was deposited in major Philippines museum and the US. More than 10,000 bird and 4,300 mammal specimens have been deposited at the UPLB Museum of Natural History which have become material for taxonomic and ecological studies, historical DNA sequencing, and phylogenetic analyses.

Integrated Biodiversity Exhibit 
The Integrated Biodiversity Exhibit is a 1,500 square meter area of displays featuring collected specimens that have been prepared for public exhibition and appreciation. It features specimens distributed to several dioramas depicting marine, forest, and cave ecosystems.

New species discoveries 
For a small organization, the museum is a productive research organization in terms of discoveries and new descriptions of species. Below are some species of organisms which have been directly described by curators and staff, or in which they were a significant part of, and/or those which have been named in honor of them.

More species listed in UPLB Museum of Natural History website.

Public service activities 
As a public service institution dedicated to biodiversity conservation education, the museum regularly holds exhibits, special tours, seminars, training programs, and provide technical assistance to local government units, other organizations and communities.

For scientists and researchers, the museum is able to provide services such as scientific name verification, biological specimen identification, and provision of microbial cultures.

The museum publishes its own peer-reviewed journal, Laksambuhay: The UPLB Journal of Natural History.

Aside from hosting its own scientific gathering, i.e. CLADES 2017, to gather stakeholders of the Philippine natural history collections system and enhance the overall appreciation of natural history collections for increased networking and collaboration, the Museum also collaborates with other scientific organizations and societies in the holding of meetings and conferences, e.g. 25th SEAZA Conference (2018) and the 11th ANRRC International Meeting Philippines (2019) which highlighted the roles of biological resource centers, that includes museums, in the conservation, preservation, and utilization of animal, plant and microbial resources.

Organization and administration 
The museum is headed by a Director which is appointed by the UPLB Chancellor for a term of three (3 years), renewable for at least two (2) terms. The Director is selected by the Chancellor traditionally from the set of eligible faculty nominees. During the Director's administration, he or she is supported by Coordinators which can be appointed from the regular personnel. To facilitate and assist the Director in administering improvements and execution of the mandates and functions of the Museum, coordinators of major functions (Research, Extension, Collections Management, Linkages and Academic Programs) are duly appointed.

Museum curators 
There are 29 UPLB regular faculty, Professors Emeriti and researchers recently appointed by the UPLB Chancellor to serve as Museum Curators based on their field of expertise. The museum curator's specialization and projects in their own respected academic and research field hold significant contributions to the raising worldwide status and recognition of the museum.

At present, there are four (4) curators for the Botanical Herbarium and Hortorium, seven (7) for the Entomological Museum curators, three (3) for the Microbial and Algal Culture Collections, three (3) for the Forestry Herbarium and Wood collection, two (2) for the Mycological Herbarium, 10 for the Zoological and Wildlife Collections and one curator for the Special Collections.

Outstanding achievements 
The UPLB Museum of Natural History is a multi-awarded organization with well-recognized staff and curators. Its most active personnel and experts not only contribute to the expansion of the collections but also lend credence to the experience and capability of the museum in terms of natural history research and studies; taxonomy and systematics; biodiversity conservation and education.

References

External links 

Official Website
Leopoldo Uichanco

University museums in the Philippines
Natural history museums in the Philippines
Buildings and structures in Laguna (province)
Museum of Natural History